The Office of the Mayor of Lafayette, known historically as Vermilionville, was established by an amendment passed on March 9, 1869, which replaced the "regular preliminaries of laying out" enacted by the Legislature upon the incorporation of Vermilionville on March 11, 1836. This amended city charter remained in place until 1914, when the citizens of Lafayette voted in favor of discarding the mayor-council government to be replaced by a city commission, the first of three members, the Commissioner of Public Safety, would serve as an ex-officio mayor.

List

References

External links
 
 

People from Lafayette, Louisiana
Lists of mayors of places in Louisiana